Zachariah Atinasio is a South Sudanese footballer who currently plays as a defender.

International career
He has made at least two senior appearances for South Sudan against Ethiopia and Kenya in the 2012 CECAFA Cup.

References

Living people
South Sudanese footballers
South Sudan international footballers
Association football defenders
Year of birth missing (living people)